Last is a surname and may be:

 James Last (1929–2015), German composer and big-band leader
 John M. Last (1926-2019), public health educator
 Robert Last, multiple people
 Werner Last (1926–1982), German bandleader, better known as Kai Warner
 William Isaac Last (1857–1911), English engineer and Director of the Science Museum, London